Acrotaeniostola interrupta is a species of tephritid or fruit flies in the genus Acrotaeniostola of the family Tephritidae.

Distribution
Malaysia.

References

Tephritinae
Insects described in 1988
Diptera of Asia